The 2022 World Series was the championship series of Major League Baseball's (MLB) 2022 season. The 118th edition of the World Series, it was a best-of-seven playoff between the American League (AL) champion Houston Astros and the National League (NL) champion Philadelphia Phillies. The Astros defeated the Phillies in six games to earn their second championship. The series was broadcast in the United States on Fox television and ESPN Radio. 

The Houston Astros entered the 2022 MLB postseason as the AL West champions and the top-seeded AL team, while the Phillies won a wild card, earning the sixth and final NL playoff berth. The Phillies took a 2–1 lead after three games, before the Astros won the final three games to win the series. Jeremy Peña won the World Series Most Valuable Player Award, becoming the first position player to win the award as a rookie.

The series was notable for having the first World Series no-hitter since Don Larsen's perfect game in the 1956 World Series, when Astros pitchers Cristian Javier, Bryan Abreu, Rafael Montero and Ryan Pressly achieved a combined no-hitter in Game 4. It was also the third postseason no-hitter in MLB history, after Roy Halladay's no-hitter (also pitched in Citizens Bank Park) in Game 1 of the 2010 National League Division Series.

MLB has sold sponsorships to various postseason series since 2017, with YouTube TV serving as the official presenting sponsor of the World Series from 2017 through 2019. The World Series did not have a presenting sponsor in 2020 or 2021, but resumed sponsorship in 2022. As a result of a new multi-year agreement with Capital One, this World Series was officially known as the 2022 World Series presented by Capital One.

Background

This was the second postseason meeting between the Houston Astros and the Philadelphia Phillies following their 1980 National League Championship Series encounter, which was won by Philadelphia, 3–2, en route to winning the 1980 World Series.

Houston and Philadelphia met in the last series of the 2022 MLB season in Houston. Houston won two of the three games, although Philadelphia clinched their postseason berth in the first game with a win. No black players born in the United States were included on either team's roster during the World Series, which marked the first time since , shortly after the breaking of the baseball color line in 1947, that this occurred.

Houston Astros

This is the fifth World Series appearance for the Astros, and the fourth as the American League team. The Astros qualified for the 2022 postseason as the American League (AL) West division winner. It was their fifth AL West championship in six years and their second straight divisional championship. The Astros entered the postseason as the top seed in the American League. In the Division Series, they swept the fifth-seeded Seattle Mariners. In the American League Championship Series, they swept the second-seeded New York Yankees to make it to the World Series for the fourth time in the previous six seasons (2017, 2019, 2021) and the second consecutive season.

Houston's pitching staff led the American League in 2022 with the fewest runs allowed, lowest opponent's batting average and walks plus hits per inning pitched, the most strikeouts, and posted an MLB-best 2.78 bullpen earned run average (ERA). Justin Verlander, who had missed Houston's postseason runs in 2020 and 2021, made his return from Tommy John surgery and led the AL in wins, ERA, and walks plus hits per inning pitched ratio. Rookie shortstop Jeremy Peña won the League Championship Series Most Valuable Player Award after batting 6-for-18 (.333) with two home runs and two doubles in the ALCS.

Dusty Baker, in his 25th season as a major league manager, was seeking his first World Series win. At 73 years of age, Baker was the oldest manager in World Series history.

Philadelphia Phillies

This was the eighth World Series appearance for the Phillies and the first since 2009. The Phillies struggled at the start of the 2022 season. From there, the Phillies went . They clinched a postseason berth on the third to last day of the season; they were the last postseason team of the 12 to clinch a berth. They qualified for the postseason as the sixth seed wild card entrant with an  record.

In the National League Wild Card Series, they swept the National League Central division winner St. Louis Cardinals, who were ranked third in the National League. In the National League Division Series, they defeated the defending World Series champion and National League East division winner Atlanta Braves in four games, the NL's second seed. In the National League Championship Series (NLCS), they defeated the fifth-seeded San Diego Padres in five games to clinch a World Series berth for the first time since 2009, which the Phillies lost in six games to the New York Yankees. Bryce Harper won the most valuable player award for the NLCS after batting 8-for-20 (.400) with two home runs and three doubles. With their third-place finish, the Phillies were the first team to finish in third place in their division to advance to a World Series since the 1981 New York Yankees.

Dave Dombrowski, the Phillies' president of baseball operations, made his fifth World Series appearance. Dombrowski is the first lead executive to make World Series appearances with four different teams, having done so with the Florida Marlins in 1997, Detroit Tigers in 2006 and 2012, and the Boston Red Sox in 2018.

Summary

 Game 3 was postponed from October 31, due to rain; consequently, all subsequent games were postponed by one day from the original schedule.

Game summaries

Game 1

Before Game 1, Eric Burton of Black Pumas sang "The Star-Spangled Banner". Terry Puhl threw the ceremonial first pitch and Simone Biles called "play ball!". Justin Verlander started for the Astros while Aaron Nola started for the Phillies. This was the first World Series since 1915 to start on a Friday.

Kyle Tucker hit a solo home run off of Nola in the bottom of the second inning. Nola then gave up two singles to Yuli Gurriel and Chas McCormick. With runners at the corners, Martín Maldonado hit a run batted in single scoring Gurriel. José Altuve grounded into a double play to end the inning. Jeremy Peña doubled to start the third for Houston and Alex Bregman drew a walk. Tucker hit a three-run home run into the Astros bullpen to give Houston a 5–0 lead. Verlander took a no-hit bid into the top of the fourth inning when he gave up a single to Rhys Hoskins. Bryce Harper singled, moving Hoskins to third. Nick Castellanos drove in Hoskins with a single, and Alec Bohm drove in Harper and Castellanos with a double down the left-field line to trim the lead to two. In the top of the fifth inning, Verlander gave up a leadoff double to Brandon Marsh, and walked Kyle Schwarber. J. T. Realmuto hit a double off the base of the wall to score both runners and tie the game at five. Realmuto advanced to third on a Harper groundout, but Verlander struck out Castellanos, ending the inning. At the top of the sixth, Nola was replaced by José Alvarado, who retired the side.

The game remained tied through nine innings, and entered extra innings. In the top of the tenth inning, Realmuto hit a solo home run off Luis García to give the Phillies a one-run lead. After a Harper single and a Bryson Stott walk, García was taken out of the game and replaced with Ryne Stanek, who was able to get out of the inning. In the bottom of the tenth inning, David Robertson struck out Yordan Álvarez before giving up a double to Bregman. Tucker tipped off a fair ball that bounced in front of home plate and was thrown out at first. Robertson walked Gurriel, bringing pinch hitter Aledmys Díaz to the plate. Robertson threw a wild pitch to advance the runners to second and third. After working the count to 2–1, Díaz was hit on the elbow by Robertson and started toward first base. However, the home plate umpire ruled that Díaz had leaned into the pitch, resulting in ball three. On the next pitch, Díaz grounded out, ending the game. It was the first time since 2002 that a team had overcome a five-run deficit to win a World Series game, when the San Francisco Giants – also managed by Dusty Baker – blew such a lead in Game 6.

Game 2

Little Big Town performed the national anthem before Game 2. Craig Biggio threw the ceremonial first pitch to Jeff Bagwell, and Bun B called "play ball!". Framber Valdez started for Houston and Zack Wheeler started for Philadelphia.

In the first inning, Jeremy Peña hit an RBI double to score Jose Altuve for the first run. Yordan Álvarez followed with the third straight double to bring in the second run for the Astros. With that hit, Houston became the first World Series team to start a game with three straight extra-base hits. Alvarez scored the third run on an error. In the bottom of the fifth inning, Alex Bregman hit a two-run home to left field to make the score 5–0. Nick Castellanos scored the first run for the Phillies in the seventh inning to make it 5–1. Kyle Schwarber in the top of the eighth inning hit a foul ball, which was thought to have been a two-run home run which would have made the score 5–3. He ended up flying out deep to right, just missing a home run. In the top of the ninth inning, Alec Bohm scored on an error by first baseman Yuli Gurriel to make it 5–2, which proved to be the final score.

Game 2 was also notable for umpire Pat Hoberg calling a "perfect game" with 129 of 129 pitches called correctly. Hoberg received widespread praise from both fans and the press for this accomplishment.

Game 3

Originally scheduled for October 31, Game 3 was postponed to November 1 due to rain. Every following game was pushed back one day. Bernie Parent, Mike Schmidt, Julius Erving, and Brandon Graham threw ceremonial first pitches, and Chloe Bailey sang the national anthem. Ranger Suárez started for Philadelphia, taking the place of Noah Syndergaard, who would have started if it had not been postponed. Lance McCullers Jr. started for Houston.

In the bottom of the first, Kyle Schwarber drew a walk, and Bryce Harper hit a two-run home run to right field. Alec Bohm and Brandon Marsh hit solo home runs for the Phillies in the second. Bohm's solo home run to left field in the second inning marked the 1,000th home run in World Series history. When Marsh also homered in that inning, the Phillies became the first team to hit three home runs in the first two innings of a World Series game. In the bottom of the fifth, Schwarber hit a two-run home run to dead center, and Rhys Hoskins hit a solo home run to left, making the Phillies the fourth team to hit five home runs in a World Series game, joining the 1928 Yankees, 1989 Athletics, and 2017 Astros, while McCullers became the first pitcher in history to surrender five home runs in a postseason game. Ryne Stanek relieved McCullers after Hoskins' home run. Suárez came out of the game after throwing five scoreless innings. Connor Brogdon, Kyle Gibson, Nick Nelson, and Andrew Bellatti each pitched a scoreless inning to complete the shutout as the Phillies won 7–0. All seven runs were scored via a home run.

Game 4

Jimmy Rollins and Chase Utley threw the ceremonial first pitch before Game 4 and American Idol contestant Madison Watkins sang the national anthem; Utley's pitch was caught by Rob McElhenney. An additional first pitch was thrown out by a 19-year-old cancer survivor; Jill Biden was on hand to support Stand Up to Cancer in the middle of the fifth inning. Aaron Nola made his second start of the series for the Phillies, while Cristian Javier started for the Astros. The Astros and Phillies remained scoreless through four innings. The Astros loaded the bases in the top of the fifth inning against Nola. José Alvarado relieved Nola and hit Yordan Álvarez with a pitch, scoring the game's first run and breaking a 16-innings scoreless streak for Houston. The next batter, Alex Bregman hit a two-run double, Kyle Tucker followed with a sacrifice fly, and then Yuli Gurriel singled to score Bregman.

Javier pitched six innings on 97 pitches without allowing a hit, striking out nine batters, and walking two. He was relieved by Bryan Abreu, who struck out the side in the seventh inning. Rafael Montero pitched a hitless eighth inning for the Astros. Ryan Pressly, the Astros closer, pitched in the ninth inning for the Astros, only allowing a one-out walk to Kyle Schwarber, to complete the no-hitter. It was also the third no-hitter in postseason history, after Roy Halladay threw a no-hitter for the Phillies in the 2010 National League Division Series against the Cincinnati Reds. Coincidentally, both no-hitters took place at Citizens Bank Park, and Dusty Baker was involved as a manager in both as he had managed the Reds in 2010.

Game 5

Before Game 5, Meek Mill performed a song on the field and rode with the Phillie Phanatic on an ATV. Philadelphia native Jazmine Sullivan performed the national anthem and Brad Lidge threw the ceremonial first pitch to Carlos Ruiz. Noah Syndergaard started for the Phillies and Justin Verlander started for the Astros. The Phillies donned powder blue throwback uniforms from the 1970s and 1980s while the Astros wore their orange jerseys.

José Altuve led off the game with a double, advanced to third base on an error, and scored on a single by Jeremy Peña. Kyle Schwarber led off the bottom of the first inning with a home run to tie it. Schwarber's home run was the tenth given up by Verlander in the World Series, passing Catfish Hunter for the most allowed in World Series history. Peña hit a home run to put the Astros ahead at 2–1 in the fourth inning, becoming the first rookie shortstop to hit a home run in the World Series. The Phillies, who had put runners in scoring position throughout the next four innings, did not score another run off of Verlander, who finished his appearance with six strikeouts and four walks allowed in five innings.  In the top of the eighth inning, Altuve scored from third base on a ground out by Yordan Álvarez, widening the Astros' lead to 3–1. In the bottom of the eighth inning, Nick Castellanos scored on an RBI single by Jean Segura, narrowing the Phillies' deficit and putting runners on the corners. Ryan Pressly entered to try for a five-out save, his fourth appearance in the series. He recorded a strikeout and a hard-hit groundout to Trey Mancini to end the eighth inning. In the ninth inning, Chas McCormick made a leaping catch at the right-center wall on a flyball hit by J. T. Realmuto for the second out, preventing a likely extra-base hit. The next batter, Bryce Harper, was hit by a pitch, putting the tying run on first base, but Castellanos hit a groundball to short that led to the game-ending putout from Peña to Mancini to end the game. The victory was the first World Series pitching win of Verlander's career, who had gone 0–6 in his previous eight World Series starts, including Game 1.

The change in the World Series schedule due to rain meant Game 5 went up directly against a Thursday Night Football game between the NFL franchises of both World Series cities, in which the Philadelphia Eagles defeated the Houston Texans, 29–17. Estimates from Nielsen Media Research showed the baseball game drew an average of five million more viewers, with a share of at least 50 in both Philadelphia and Houston. Meanwhile, the football game, originally scheduled to air on the Fox affiliates in both markets per NFL rules, moved to the MyNetworkTV affiliates in both markets.

Game 6

Game 6 set the record for the latest date that the World Series game has been played. The latest a World Series game had previously been played was November 4, in both 2001 and 2009. The Astros replaced Yuli Gurriel, who exited Game 5 with a knee injury, on their roster with Korey Lee. Gallery Furniture's Jim McIngvale threw the ceremonial first pitch, Andy Grammer sang the national anthem, and George Strait called "play ball!" In a rematch from Game 2, Framber Valdez started for the Astros, while Zack Wheeler started for the Phillies.

The game remained scoreless through five innings before Kyle Schwarber hit a solo home run to right field for the Phillies in the top of the sixth inning. Wheeler allowed Jose Altuve and Jeremy Peña to reach base and was relieved by José Alvarado in preparation for Yordan Álvarez. Alvarado then gave up a three-run home run to Álvarez. Later in the inning, Christian Vázquez hit an RBI single, allowing Alex Bregman to score. Pressly pitched a scoreless ninth inning for his sixth save of playoffs, with Nick Castellanos flying out to Kyle Tucker in foul territory for the final out and season's conclusion. 

Manager Dusty Baker won his first career Fall Classic victory as a manager (after 3,884 games managed, a record for a first-time winner) and Houston was the first team since the Red Sox in 2013 to officially clinch the championship in their home stadium (the Dodgers won as the home team in 2020, but that was played at a neutral site due to the COVID-19 pandemic). Peña, who was 2-for-4 in Game 6, won the World Series Most Valuable Player Award. He batted 10-for-25 (.400) with one home run in the series. Peña became the first-position player (and the third player overall) to win the award in his rookie season. In total for the postseason, the Houston bullpen allowed five total runs over  innings for an ERA of 0.83, becoming the first team to throw at least 40 postseason innings of the bullpen with an ERA below 1.00 in major league history. The Astros became the sixth team since 1960 to win the World Series after losing the previous year, with the last having been the Kansas City Royals in 2015.

Combined with the Philadelphia Union's defeat in the 2022 MLS Cup earlier in the day to Los Angeles FC, Philadelphia is the first U.S. city to lose two major league sports championships on the same day. With the win, the Astros finished 11–2 in the postseason, the fourth team to win a World Series while losing fewer than three games in the Wild Card era after the 1998 New York Yankees (11–2), the 1999 New York Yankees (11–1), and the 2005 Chicago White Sox (11–1).

Composite line score 
2022 World Series (4–2): Houston Astros beat Philadelphia Phillies.

Broadcasting

Television
For the 23rd straight year, the World Series was televised in the United States by Fox. Play-by-play announcer Joe Davis called the event for the first time, succeeding Joe Buck following the latter's departure from the network after 25 years as its lead World Series voice. Davis was joined by Baseball Hall of Famer John Smoltz as color analyst, and Ken Rosenthal and Tom Verducci as field reporters. Kevin Burkhardt hosted the pregame and postgame shows, joined by analysts Frank Thomas, Alex Rodriguez, and David Ortiz.

Outside of the United States, MLB Network produced an international feed through MLB International, which aired on Sportsnet in Canada, BT Sport in the United Kingdom, and ESPN in Australia. Dave Flemming called the play-by-play of the games, with Dan Plesac as color analyst.

Ratings
Audience includes Fox and Fox Deportes

Figures are per cited sourcing and subject to revision.

Radio
For the 25th consecutive year, ESPN Radio aired the series in the United States. Dan Shulman called the play-by-play, with Eduardo Pérez and Jessica Mendoza as color analysts and Buster Olney as field reporter. Kevin Winter and Doug Glanville hosted the pregame coverage. This was Shulman's 12th and final World Series broadcast for ESPN Radio, with Jon Sciambi succeeding him in 2023.

TUDN Radio broadcast the series in Spanish, with an announcing crew including Jesús Acostas, Enrique Burak, Alberto Ferreiro, José Luis Nápoles, Luis Eduardo Quiñones and Antonio de Valdes. The flagship radio stations for both teams broadcast the series locally. In Philadelphia, WIP-FM and WTTM aired the games in English and in Spanish respectively, while KBME and KLAT did so in Houston. During the Phillies-Eagles conflict for Game 5, WIP-FM aired the Eagles game while the Phillies aired on KYW and WPHT.

Sponsorship
The 2022 World Series was sponsored by Capital One, the credit card provider, as part of a new multi-year agreement. This sponsorship included logo branding in-stadium and on official digital properties on the field, as well as commercial inventory during Fox's telecasts of the games.

See also

2022 Japan Series
2022 Korean Series

Notes

References

External links

World Series
World Series
World Series
World Series
World Series
World Series
World Series
World Series
Houston Astros postseason
Philadelphia Phillies postseason
Baseball competitions in Houston
Baseball competitions in Philadelphia